Vranke is a small settlement east of Blagovica in the Municipality of Lukovica in Central Slovenia.

Name
Vranke was attested in written sources as Vranygk in 1477.

References

External links

Vranke on Geopedia

Populated places in the Municipality of Lukovica